The Oceania Athletics Championships is an athletics event organized by the Oceania Athletics Association (OAA) for the World Athletics (WA) (formerly the IAAF) member associations of the Oceania region. First held in 1990 in Suva, it was initially conceived as a quadrennial event; however, after the second edition in 1994, the championships changed to a biennial event. After the 2010 championships, there were significant changes in the format of the competition. Now being held as a regional championships (in 2011 and 2012), the associations were divided into two divisions based on their geographical location (either east or west). However, the competition was revised back to its original format as an area championships in 2013. 

The event has been held jointly with the Under-20 championships since 1994 and Under-18 championships since 2000. For the first time in 2014, para-athletics events were included in the championships. 

Since the inaugural championships in 1990 (up until 2017), unlike the rest of the OAA member federations, only Australia and New Zealand send their second tier teams to compete in the championships. This was to allow pacific island nations to be competitive and challenge for medals. However, in 2019, the championships became a fully tier-one competition when the then IAAF (now World Athletics), made a change in the qualification system for the 2019 World Championships in Doha as well as the 2020 Summer Olympics set for Tokyo. The rule change saw athletes would only qualify for either competition through their World Athletics ranking points. This meant that continental championships were now offering more points under the WA world rankings system.

Editions 
The 2021 edition set for Korman Stadium in Port Vila was cancelled due to the COVID-19 pandemic, making this the first cancellation of the event.

All-time medal table 
The all-time Oceania Athletics Championships medal table is the sum of all medals won by OAA member federations, associate members, as well as invited teams from the very first edition till the most recent championships in 2019. All medals counted are based on the official results posted on the Oceania Athletics Association website. Medals won by Para-athletes are also included.

Associate members with medals are listed in italic.

 Associate members of OAA - Not recognized by World Athletics.
 Regional Australia is a team from Northern Australia competing as invitees at every championships since 2013.
 Tahiti West Coast competed once back in 2013 as a local team from the host federation of French Polynesia.
 Australia Masters team competed once back in 2015 as an invited team from the host federation of Australia.

As of 2019, only Tuvalu (OAA member federation) and Niue (OAA associate member) have yet to win a medal.

Championship records

Regional Championships
Oceania Athletics has three regions. Melanesia, Micronesia and Polynesia. Since 2000, each region, in a non area championships year hold their own regional championships. The regions at the regional meetings decide the location for the Championships.

Melanesian Championships 

the Melanesian Championships.

Micronesian Championships 

the Micronesian Championships.

Polynesian Championships 

Oceania Cup 
In addition, there was a short-lived Oceania Cup, where teams from Australia, New Zealand, and the respective host country competed with combined teams from Melanesia, Micronesia, and Polynesia.  The Australian team recruited from the winner team of the Australian Clubs Championships, which was, in both years, the University of Queensland Athletic Club.

References

External links
Official Athletics Oceania website
List of previous winners

 
Athletics
Athletics
Recurring sporting events established in 1990